The Marist Sisters are an international congregation or order of Roman Catholic women. The Marist Sisters recognise Jeanne-Marie Chavoin (Mother Saint Joseph) as their Foundress and Jean-Claude Colin as their Founder.

Early life of Mother Saint Joseph
Jeanne-Marie was born in the village of Coutouvre in France on 29 August 1786, and was baptised in the church on the same day. Jeanne-Marie grew up with little formal education, but developed a deep and sure faith.  She was deeply involved in the life of the village, nurturing faith and reaching out to those who were overlooked. Though very active, she found strength and joy in long hours before the Blessed Sacrament. She was invited several times to enter different Congregations but always refused, certain that God was not calling her to these. Finally in 1817, when she was 31 years old, she received a letter from Fr Pierre Colin, brother of Jean-Claude Colin, who had once been parish priest in Coutouvre, inviting her to Cerdon to collaborate in the Marist project. She knew immediately that this was where God was calling her. With her close friend Marie Jotillon, she set off for Cerdon.

The Marist Sisters of Cerdon
Chavoin stayed at Cerdon for 6 years, for four of which she was housekeeper at the presbytery, she collaborated with the Colin brothers in shaping the future Society of Mary (Marists) - the "Work of Mary". In 1823, Marie Jotillon, her niece, Marie Gardet and Jeanne-Marie Chavoin began to live together in community in Cerdon. The first three Marist Sisters lived in dire poverty, but nevertheless, perceiving their joy and their sanctity, many young women of the town asked to join them. Eight future Marist Sisters received the habit on 8 December 1824. Soon after they were invited by Bishop Devie to go to Belley where the first profession took place on 6 September 1826. Jeanne-Marie, or Mother Saint Joseph as she was now called, was Superior General of the new Congregation till 1853, when she was urged to resign. At the age of 69 she began  a new foundation in Jarnosse, an abandoned village which was poor and needy in every way.  Here she was able to live the kind of active, inserted religious life which she had always desired for her Sisters. She died at Jarnosse on the 30 June 1858 at the age of 71.

Marist Sisters in Great Britain
The first foundation of the Marist Sisters outside France began in Spitalfields, a socially and spiritually deprived area in the East End of London, in 1858.  Five Sisters formed the pioneer community and although their main work was teaching, faithful to the founding charism, they soon involved themselves "where the needs were greatest". This involved parish visiting, running soup kitchens and work with orphaned children. Other foundations followed and in addition to the work of education in both the State and Independent sectors, a variety of additional ministries focusing on the needs of the time were undertaken.

Present distribution of the order
Missionary Sisters of the Society of Mary are engaged in missionary activity in twenty four countries of the Pacific, Africa, Asia, Europe, North America and South America. These countries include Australia,  Brazil, Canada, England, Fiji, France, Ireland, Italy, Mexico, New Zealand, Senegal, The Gambia, The Philippines, United States and Venezuela serving the many needs of people.

References

External links
 

Catholic female orders and societies
Notre Dame Educational Association